The year 1975 was the 194th year of the Rattanakosin Kingdom of Thailand. It was the 30th year in the reign of King Bhumibol Adulyadej (Rama IX), and is reckoned as year 2518 in the Buddhist Era.

Incumbents
King: Bhumibol Adulyadej 
Crown Prince: Vajiralongkorn
Prime Minister:
 until 26 February: Sanya Dharmasakti
 15 February – 13 March: Seni Pramoj
 starting 14 March: Kukrit Pramoj
Supreme Patriarch: Ariyavangsagatayana VII

Births
 17 June – Phiyada Akkraseranee, actress

 
Years of the 20th century in Thailand
Thailand
Thailand
1970s in Thailand